Copton Mill is a tower mill in Copton, Faversham, Kent, England that was built in 1863 to pump water for Faversham Water Company's waterworks. It is just south of junction 6 of the M2 motorway.

History

Copton Mill was built by the millwrights Spray and Harmer in 1863. The mill was marked on the 1858–72 and 1903–10 Ordnance Survey maps. It was worked by wind until 1930, when the cap and sails were removed and replaced with a  water tank.

Owners
Faversham Water Company
Mid Kent Water Company
South East Water

Description

Copton Mill is a three-storey brick tower mill which formerly had a Kentish-style cap. The mill was winded by a fantail. An oil engine was used as auxiliary power.

References

External links
Windmill World page on the mill.

Windmills in Kent
Tower mills in the United Kingdom
Windmills completed in 1863
Water supply infrastructure
Water supply and sanitation in England
Buildings and structures in Faversham